Pioneers Escarpment is a mostly snow-covered north-facing escarpment, interrupted by occasional bluffs and spurs, between Slessor Glacier on the north and Shotton Snowfield on the south, in the Shackleton Range. The escarpment was photographed from the air by the U.S. Navy, 1967, and was surveyed by British Antarctic Survey (BAS), 1968–71. So named by United Kingdom Antarctic Place-Names Committee (UK-APC) because features on the escarpment are named after the pioneers whose inventions have assisted living and traveling conditions in the polar regions.

References 

Escarpments of Antarctica
Landforms of Coats Land